Lyudmila Skubko-Karpas was a Soviet painter, who lived and worked in Moscow (since 1924).

Biography 
Lyudmila Skubko-Karpas was born in 1923 in Petrograd (St. Petersburg). She lived in Moscow since 1924 with the exception of 3 years of war-time evacuation to the Urals (1941–1944) and 7 years of life in Paris, France (1990–1997).

Developed traditions of Russian realistic fine art and Soviet impressionism.
Exhibited mainly works in oil and pastel, her prolific, mainly pencil drawings were practically unknown up to now.
Started drawing and painting in childhood. Her masterpiece "Head of an elk" charcoal drawing , 1933, is a work of a 10-year child.
In 1947-48 studied in a private studio of Robert Falk, whose lessons helped her become a subtle colourist. Academic education: V.I. Surikov Moscow State Artistic Institute (class of G. Ryazsky) graduated in 1952 Her diploma "Детская радиопередача» («Child broadcast"), 1952, was exhibited in socialist countries of Eastern Europe a best diploma work. 

She married fellow painter, Sergey Mikhailovich Skubko, in 1984. They raised two sons: Yury (1953) and Alexey (1958). Skubko-Karpas died in Moscow in 2012.

Among some interesting expositions:
In 1974-1978 participated in group expositions by most talented
women-artists in the Moscow House of Writers (famous MASSOlit from Bulgakov’s "Master and Margareth")
1991, 1993 participated in Salon d'Automne (Paris)
1995 Personal exhibition in Karnegy foundation Centre in Moscow
2013 Memorial exhibition in Tverskaya-Yamskaya, 20 Art Gallery of Moscow painters
Hundreds of paintings compose a rich creative heritage of the artist, disposed in museums, art-galleries and private collections in Russia and abroad (especially France).

Gallery

References 
 Moscow painters Lyudmila Skubko-Karpas and Sergey Skubko. Paintings/graphic art (Московские художники Людмила Скубко-Карпас и Сергей Скубко. Живопись.графика). Documentary film. Moscow 2013.  
 Lyudmila Skubko-Karpas. Drawings of a master (Людмила Скубко-Карпас.Рисунки мастера). Moscow.2015. 
 From the art heritage of Moscow painters Sergey Skubko and Lyudmila Skubko-Karpas (Из творческого наследия московских художников Сергея Скубко и Людмилы Скубко-Карпас) Moscow 2016.

External links
www.skubkokarpas.ru

1923 births
2012 deaths
Soviet painters